A Cauchy problem in mathematics asks for the solution of a partial differential equation that satisfies certain conditions that are given on a hypersurface in the domain. A Cauchy problem can be an initial value problem or a boundary value problem (for this case see also Cauchy boundary condition). It is named after Augustin-Louis Cauchy.

Formal statement

For a partial differential equation defined on Rn+1 and a smooth manifold S ⊂ Rn+1 of dimension n (S is called the Cauchy surface), the Cauchy problem consists of finding the unknown functions  of the differential equation with respect to the independent variables  that satisfies

subject to the condition, for some value ,

where  are given functions defined on the surface  (collectively known as the Cauchy data of the problem). The derivative of order zero means that the function itself is specified.

Cauchy–Kowalevski theorem
The Cauchy–Kowalevski theorem states that If all the functions  are analytic in some neighborhood of the point , and if all the functions  are analytic in some neighborhood of the point , then the Cauchy problem has a unique analytic solution in some neighborhood of the point .

See also 

Cauchy boundary condition
Cauchy horizon

References

External links 
 Cauchy problem at MathWorld.

Partial differential equations
Mathematical problems
Boundary value problems

de:Anfangswertproblem#Partielle Differentialgleichungen